The Island  is an inhabited island in the River Thames in England on the reach above Bell Weir Lock, a part of the Hythe End part of Wraysbury village and civil parish, Berkshire. It is connected to that side of the river and although part of Berkshire was, like the village, part of Buckinghamshire before 1974.  

The Island lies alongside the course of Egham Regatta.

See also
Islands in the River Thames

Island, The
Royal Borough of Windsor and Maidenhead